Modern pentathlon competitions at the 2011 Pan American Games in Guadalajara was held from October 15 to October 16 at the Hipica Club. The sport became the first sport to be completed out of the 36 sports on the program.

Medal summary

Medal table

Events

Schedule
All times are Central Daylight Time (UTC-5).

Qualification

There is a quota of 40 athletes (24 male, 16 female) (however one spot over quota for each gender was allowed); Mexico as the host country is guaranteed a full team of four athletes (two men and two women). Qualification is done on a country basis, not an individual basis.

References

External links
Official modern pentathlon results

 
Events at the 2011 Pan American Games
2011
Pan American Games